Thomas Joseph Potter (1828–1873) was a British priest, educator and writer of hymns.

Potter was born on 9 June 1828 in Scarborough, Yorkshire, England. In 1847 he became a Roman Catholic and became a priest. He was Professor of Pulpit Eloquence and English Literature at All Hallows College, Dublin. He published several books on preaching, some stories and various hymns and translations such as a translation of the Vesper hymns.

He died on 31 August 1873 in Dublin, Ireland.

Hymns
"Brightly gleams our banner"

Publications
 Legends, Lyrics, and Hymns, by Fr T. J. Potter, 1862.
 Holy Family Hymns, contributions from Fr Thomas Potter,1860.
 The Rector's Daughter or Love and Duty: A Catholic Tale by Rev. Thomas J. Potter, Published by James Duffy and printed by Moore & Murphy, Dublin, 1861.
 Sacred Eloquence, or, the Theory and Practice of Preaching by Rev. Thomas J. Potter, Dublin, 1868. 
 The Pastor And His People: Or The Word Of God And The Flock Of Christ by Rev. Thomas J. Potter (1869)
 The Spoken Word: Or The Art Of Extemporary Preaching, Its Utility, Its Danger, And Its True Idea   by Thomas J. Potter (1872)
 The Farleyes of Farleye or Faithful and True "A tale in three books" by Rev. Thomas J. Potter 1884

References 

English Roman Catholics
Converts to Roman Catholicism from Anglicanism
1828 births
1873 deaths
People from Scarborough, North Yorkshire